Divided & United: The Songs of the Civil War is a compilation album of American Civil War music recorded by various artists. It was released on November 5, 2013 through ATO Records. The album was produced with the help of music supervisor Randall Poster, whose credits include work with Boardwalk Empire and Moonrise Kingdom. The album features contributions from many notable country and bluegrass musicians, including Loretta Lynn, Old Crow Medicine Show, Dolly Parton, T Bone Burnett, Del McCoury, and Karen Elson, among others.

Track listing

Chart performance

References